In the Line of Fire is the fourteenth studio album by Robin Trower, and the third to feature Davey Pattison on lead vocals.

The song "Isn't It Time" was originally recorded by the English group The Babys in 1977 and  released on their album Broken Heart. The front cover captures Trower at Cherry Street, Two Bridges, Manhattan, New York City.

Track listing

''The album was re-released as part of a 2 disc set called The Complete Atlantic Recordings in 2020 by Wounded Bird Records.

Personnel
Robin Trower Band
Davey Pattison – vocals
Robin Trower – guitar
Bobby Mayo – keyboards
John Regan – bass
Tony Beard – drums

Guests
Matt Noble – keyboards on "Under the Gun"
Bashiri Johnson – percussion
Peppy Castro – background vocals
Al Fritsch – background vocals

References 

Source – Album cover and liner notes.

External links 
 TrowerPower.com - Official website
 Robin Trower - In the Line of Fire (1990) album releases & credits at Discogs
 Robin Trower - In the Line of Fire (1990) album to be listened on Spotify

1990 albums
Robin Trower albums
Albums produced by Eddie Kramer
Atlantic Records albums